Roger is a Pakistani drama that was aired on PTV. It is a drama that included three actors from Pakistani cinema as Arbaaz Khan, Ali Tabish and Shamil Khan. It was also made by the help from the Pakistani Police.

Plot
The drama is about the Pakistani Police and how it tackles crime and the underworld.

Cast and crew
Noman Ijaz-Jamal Shahab
Khayam Sarhadi
Arbaaz Khan
Shamil Khan
Fiza Ali-Faiza
Rija 
Azra Aftab
Abid Ali
Abdullah Ejaz-ACP
Ali Tabish
Fareeha Jabeen
Shazia Afgan 
Ashraf Khan
Jameel Fakhri 
Khalid Butt
Rasheed Aliroger 
Ruby Anum
Ghazala Butt
Raima Khan
Director-Ayeza Irfan
Writer- Tariq Ismaeel Sagar and  Shahid Nazir
Music- Sahir Ali Bagga
Lyrics- Asam Raza and Dr Syed Azhar Hassan Nadeem
Set-Azam Malik and Irum Rehman
Audio-Shafaat Cheema and Ibrar Ahmad
DOP- Nadim Akber Dar

References

Pakistan Television Corporation original programming
Urdu-language television shows
Police procedural television series
Pakistani crime television series
Insurgency in Khyber Pakhtunkhwa fiction
Military of Pakistan in fiction